Erewan can refer to:
Yerevan in Armenia
Erawan Waterfall in Erawan National Park, Kanchanaburi Province, Thailand

See also
Erawan (disambiguation)